Kyaunggon Township is a township of Kyonpyaw District in the Ayeyarwady Division of Myanmar.

See also
List of villages in Kyaunggon Township

References

Townships of Ayeyarwady Region